Aliaksandr Parkhomenka (born 22 March 1981) is a Belarusian decathlete.

Achievements

References

Living people
Belarusian decathletes
Athletes (track and field) at the 2004 Summer Olympics
Athletes (track and field) at the 2008 Summer Olympics
Olympic athletes of Belarus
Universiade medalists in athletics (track and field)
1981 births
Universiade gold medalists for Belarus
Medalists at the 2005 Summer Universiade